The 1998–99 Grand Prix of Figure Skating Final was an elite figure skating competition held in Saint Petersburg, Russia from March 5 through 7, 1999. Medals were awarded in men's singles, ladies' singles, pair skating, and ice dancing.

The Grand Prix Final was the culminating event of the ISU Grand Prix of Figure Skating series, which consisted of Skate America, Skate Canada International, Sparkassen Cup on Ice, Trophée Lalique, Cup of Russia, and NHK Trophy competitions. The top six skaters from each discipline competed in the final.

Results

Men

Ladies

Pairs

Ice dancing

External links
 Grand Prix Final
 SP report from SI
 Russian skaters dominate finals

Grand Prix of Figure Skating Final
Grand Prix of Figure Skating Final
Grand Prix of Figure Skating Final
International figure skating competitions hosted by Russia
Grand Prix of Figure Skating Final
Sports competitions in Saint Petersburg